The mixed doubles tennis event of the 2015 Pan American Games will be held from July 12–16 at the Canadian Tennis Centre in Toronto, Canada.

Seeds

Draw

Finals

Top half

Bottom half

References

Mixed Doubles